NGC 6782 is a barred spiral galaxy located in the southern constellation of Pavo, at a distance of approximately  from the Milky Way. It was discovered on July 12, 1834 by English astronomer John Herschel. John L. E. Dreyer described it as, "considerably faint, considerably small, round, a little brighter middle, 9th magnitude star to south". The morphological classification of NGC 6782 is (R1R′2)SB(r)a, indicating a barred spiral galaxy with a multiple ring system and tightly-wound spiral arms.

At the galactic core is an almost circular nuclear ring at the inner Lindblad resonance. This is attached to the primary bar, which extends out to a somewhat pointy, diamond-shaped inner ring. It is actually a double-barred galaxy, with an interior bar inside the nuclear ring. A pair of faint spiral arms extend out from the inner ring to the outer parts of the galaxy, where it joints a double outer ring system. Both inner rings of the galaxy are undergoing star formation, producing hot OB stars, with little star formation occurring in the remainder.


Gallery

See also
 Messier 94 - a similar spiral galaxy

References

External links
 
 Hubble Heritage site: Pictures and description

NGC 6782
Pavo (constellation)
6782
63168